This is a discography of British  electronic musician Bryn Jones as  and Muslimgauze.

Plain reissues and compilation tracks taken from albums are not included.

as

as Muslimgauze

Studio albums

Live albums

EPs and singles

Box sets

Tributes

Compilation albums

Expanded reissues

Remixes

Compilation tracks

References

External links

Muslimgauze discography at Rate Your Music

Discography
Discographies of British artists
Electronic music discographies